The Kamativi mine is one of the largest tin mines in Zimbabwe. The mine is located in western Zimbabwe in Matabeleland North Province. The Kamativi mine has reserves amounting to 100 million tonnes of tin ore grading 0.28%  tin thus resulting 0.28 million tonnes of tin.

References 

Lithium mines in Zimbabwe